Bahía Asunción Airstrip  is a public dirt airstrip located North of Bahía Asunción, Municipality of Mulegé, Baja California Sur, Mexico, on the Pacific Ocean coast.

The airstrip is used solely for general aviation purposes.

References

External links
Baja Bush Pilots forum about Bahía Asunción

Airports in Baja California Sur
Mulegé Municipality